Private nonindustrial forest lands are forest lands in various countries, owned by a private individual or organization that does not also own a wood processing facility.

Nonindustrial private forests cover about 360 million acres in the United States, or roughly one-half of the nation's total forested acres.

Nonindustrial private forests or “NIPFs” are unlike public or industrial forests. Most of these forests are small, family owned, and timber-producing. In terms of size, 95 percent cover less than 100 acres, and 60 percent cover less than 10 acres. Due to parcellization, the number of NIPF owners has increased in recent decades, while the average tract size has shrunk. Nonetheless, at 360 million cumulative acres, nonindustrial private forests constitute a significant portion of the nation’s undeveloped land.

Most nonindustrial private forests are family owned. Title to 250 million acres,. or 70 percent of all NIPFs, is held by individuals, married couples, or family estates and trusts. These family owned forests tend to pass from generation to generation. Those that are not family owned are held by partnerships, tribes, or corporations.

"Nonindustrial private forests are a significant source of the nation’s wood products, but they are also engines of environmental goods and services. These lands filter drinking water, supply wildlife habitat, sequester carbon, and provide open space. Many of these benefits spill onto neighboring lands and communities, often at little or no charge. Forest landowners, however, must have access to markets for their wood products if these lands are to remain forested and environmentally productive.

Two initiatives aimed at enhancing environmental quality could have the opposite effect by limiting the market opportunities for private forest landowners. The first is sustainability certification. What was once a voluntary way to distinguish forest products in the marketplace is becoming an untenable requirement for an increasing number of private forest landowners. Though many NIPFs harvest wood in a way that comports with Best Management Practices, and few consumers are demanding certified products, failure to certify could soon prevent small forest owners from accessing wood markets.

See also 
 List of types of formally designated forests

References 

Agriculture in the United States
Types of formally designated forests
Forestry in the United States